In algebraic geometry, a semistable abelian variety is an abelian variety defined over a global or local field, which is characterized by how it reduces at the primes of the field.

gives back . The Néron model is a smooth group scheme, so we can consider , the connected component of the Néron model which contains the identity for the group law. This is an open subgroup scheme of the Néron model. If  is a global field, then  is semistable if it has good or semistable reduction at all primes.

Semistable elliptic curve
A semistable elliptic curve may be described more concretely as an elliptic curve that has bad reduction only of multiplicative type. Suppose  is an elliptic curve defined over the rational number field . It is known that there is a finite, non-empty set S of prime numbers  for which  has bad reduction modulo . Roughly speaking, the condition of multiplicative reduction amounts to saying that the singular point is a double point, rather than a cusp. Deciding whether this condition holds is effectively computable by Tate's algorithm. Therefore in a given case it is decidable whether or not the reduction is semistable, namely multiplicative reduction at worst.

The semistable reduction theorem for  may also be made explicit:  acquires semistable reduction over the extension of  generated by the coordinates of the points of order 12.

References

  
 

Abelian varieties
Diophantine geometry
Elliptic curves